The Lucky-S incident occurred on January 7, 1993, when Turkish Navy vessels, carrying members of the Turkish Narcotic Police, intercepted the MV Lucky-S, a Turkish ocean freighter in international waters in the Mediterranean Sea. The ship was suspected of being involved in smuggling illegal drugs into Turkey.
It was the second Turkish anti-drug-smuggling operation on the high seas in three weeks, following the Kısmetim-1 incident.   cannabis and  morphine base were captured on the ship, which was escorted to a Turkish port.

Trial 
Eleven people arrested as a result of the operation were convicted of involvement in the drug trade.
Şeyhmus Daş, who was also found to have organized drug trafficking by the Kısmetim-1 and was imprisoned, escaped from custody on November 8, 1994, as he was brought from Sinop Fortress Prison to the 1st State Security Court in Istanbul for trial over his involvement in the Lucky-S incident. On March 16, 1995, he was sentenced in absentia to 24 years imprisonment in a maximum-security prison.
It was alleged that the drugs on the ship belonged mostly to the Turkish drug lord Halil İbrahim Havar, son of the arms trafficker. He was tried and sentenced to 30 years imprisonment. He is serving his sentence in the maximum-security Uşak Prison.

Popular cultural 
Walley of the Volves Turkish media Film series Lucky-S and Kısmetim-1 criminal terrorist for Şanslı-S and Nasibim-1

See also 
 Kısmetim-1 incident

References 

1993 in Turkey
Cargo ships
Merchant ships of Turkey
International maritime incidents
Maritime incidents in 1993
Law enforcement in Turkey
History of the Mediterranean
January 1993 events in Europe